The 2022 Washington Nationals season was the Nationals' 18th season as the baseball franchise of Major League Baseball in the District of Columbia, the 15th season at Nationals Park, and the 54th since the original team was started in Montreal, Quebec, Canada. The Nationals failed to improve on their 65–97 record from the previous year, losing 107 games,  having the worst record in the major leagues for the first time since 2009. The 107 losses came just three years after their first World Series title in 2019. It also marked the first time since 2009 that the Nationals lost 100 or more games in one season. In addition, it is the fifth time in franchise history that the Nationals lost 100 or more games, along with 1969, 1976, 2008, and 2009. To further add to Washington's dismal season, Juan Soto, along with Josh Bell, left the team via a trade to the San Diego Padres during the trade deadline.

On December 2, 2021, Commissioner of Baseball Rob Manfred announced a lockout of players, following expiration of the collective bargaining agreement (CBA) between the league and the Major League Baseball Players Association (MLBPA). On March 10, 2022, the MLB and MLBPA agreed to a new collective bargaining agreement, thus ending the lockout. Opening Day was played on April 7. Although MLB previously announced that several series would be cancelled due to the lockout, the agreement provides for a 162-game season, with originally canceled games to be made up via doubleheaders.

Near the end of the first half of the MLB season, the Washington Nationals went on a 9-game losing streak, their longest since their 11-game losing streak that started near the end of their 2008 season and extended into the beginning of the 2009 season. On September 6, they were the first team eliminated from playoff contention.

Offseason

Lockout 

The expiration of the league's collective bargaining agreement (CBA) with the Major League Baseball Players Association occurred on December 1, 2021 with no new agreement in place. As a result, the team owners voted unanimously to lockout the players stopping all free agency and trades.

The parties came to an agreement on a new CBA on March 10, 2022.

Rule changes 
Pursuant to the new CBA, several new rules were instituted for the 2022 season. The National League will adopt the designated hitter full-time, a draft lottery will be implemented, the postseason will expand from ten teams to twelve, and advertising patches will appear on player uniforms and helmets for the first time.

Team news 

After finishing with the fifth-worst record in Major League Baseball (65–97) in the 2021 season, the Nationals are expected to draft fifth overall in the 2022 Major League Baseball draft, barring a change in the draft order under a new collective bargaining agreement.

Despite the Nationals' losing record and poor pitching performances in 2021, manager Dave Martinez announced that pitching coach Jim Hickey would return for a second year in 2022; Martinez himself will return for a fifth season, along with most of the 2021 coaching staff. The Washington Post reported that first base coach Randy Knorr and third base coach Bob Henley would not return to the major league field staff, instead becoming the catching and field coordinators for the Nationals' player development system, following the departure of a number of coaches and coordinators late in the 2021 season. With hitting coach Kevin Long's one-year contract expiring, The Athletic reported that he would join the Philadelphia Phillies coaching staff, replacing former Nationals coach Joe Dillon, who returned to Washington as the organization's new minor league hitting coordinator. To replace Long, the Nationals announced the hiring of veteran hitting coach Darnell Coles, most recently of the Arizona Diamondbacks, on October 18, 2021. The Nationals hired former professional outfielder and Seattle Mariners minor league coach Eric Young Jr. as their first base coach later that month. The day after the 2021 World Series ended, on November 3, the Nationals announced the hiring of two new coaches previously with the New York Mets: third base coach Gary DiSarcina and bullpen coach Ricky Bones, with incumbent bullpen coach Henry Blanco moving to a newly created position as catching and strategy coach. The Nationals also replaced head strength and conditioning coach Matt Eiden, promoting Tony Rogowski from a minor league coordinator position to take on the major league coaching job. Minor league pitching coach Sam Narron was named pitching coordinator for the entire player development system, paired with Knorr and Henley in their new development roles. The Nationals also hired former major league outfielder Coco Crisp as outfield and baserunning coordinator, along with former minor league manager José Alguacil as infield coordinator and former major league infielder Bill Mueller as quality control coordinator. De Jon Watson, previously a special assistant to general manager Mike Rizzo, was named as the Nationals' new director of player development after assistant general manager Mark Scialabba, who had overseen player development for the Nationals since 2013, was reassigned to focus on player personnel. Organizational stalwart Spin Williams was joined by former Mets bench coach Dave Jauss as senior advisor to Watson in his new player development role. Under Watson, the Nationals made a major expansion to their minor league player development staff over the offseason, creating fourteen new positions and hiring more than 20 new staff members.

Catcher Alex Avila, left-handed pitcher Luis Avilán, first baseman Ryan Zimmerman, infielders Alcides Escobar and Jordy Mercer, and outfielder Gerardo Parra were set to become unrestricted free agents following the 2021 season. Three of those players retired, while the other three returned to the organization on new contracts. Avila announced on September 19, 2021, that he would retire from professional baseball. Zimmerman, the Nationals' longest-tenured player and first pick in the 2005 draft, announced his retirement on February 15, 2022. Mercer announced he was retiring as well on April 5, 2022. The Nationals announced a $1 million extension for Escobar through the 2022 season on October 5, 2021, days after the end of the regular season. Avilán signed a new minor league deal in November to remain with the Nationals as he continued to rehab from Tommy John surgery. Parra also signed a minor league deal with an invitation to spring training. Additionally, the Nationals saw left-handed pitchers Alberto Baldonado and Sean Nolin and right-handed pitchers Steven Fuentes and Kyle McGowin depart as minor league free agents after they were outrighted to the Triple-A Rochester Red Wings. Baldonado, Fuentes, and Nolin signed new minor league contracts to return to the Nationals organization, although the Nationals later released Nolin so he could sign with the Kia Tigers of the KBO League in South Korea.

The Nationals entered the offseason with ten players expected to be eligible for salary arbitration: right-handed pitchers Erick Fedde, Ryne Harper, Tanner Rainey, Joe Ross, Wander Suero, and Austin Voth, first baseman Josh Bell, and outfielders Víctor Robles, Juan Soto, and Andrew Stevenson. They avoided arbitration with Stevenson on November 29, signing him to an $850,000 non-guaranteed salary. Harper and Suero were not tendered new contracts, nor was first baseman Mike Ford, who was not eligible for arbitration. The Nationals settled with Bell, Fedde, Rainey, Ross, Soto, and Voth on March 22, 2022, and with Robles on April 3.

Free agents linked to the Nationals in media reports included left-handed pitcher Andrew Heaney (most recently of the Los Angeles Angels; ultimately signed with the Los Angeles Dodgers); and outfielders Kyle Schwarber (most recently of the Boston Red Sox; ultimately signed with the Philadelphia Phillies), Seiya Suzuki (posted by the Hiroshima Toyo Carp of Nippon Professional Baseball; ultimately signed with the Chicago Cubs), and Chris Taylor (most recently of the Los Angeles Dodgers; ultimately re-signed with the Dodgers).

For their first offseason acquisition, the Nationals claimed rookie left-handed reliever Francisco Pérez off waivers from the Cleveland Guardians on November 5, 2021. Washington also claimed infielder Lucius Fox from the interleague-rival Baltimore Orioles on November 30, furthermore signing free agent infielder César Hernández the same day.

The offseason was brought to a virtual halt as Nationals principal owner Mark Lerner and 29 other team owners voted unanimously to institute a lockout, due to the expiration of the collective bargaining agreement that had been in effect since the 2016 season on December 1, 2021. During the lockout, the Nationals continued to sign players to minor league contracts, including veteran infielders Dee Strange-Gordon and Maikel Franco and outfielder Rusney Castillo, and acquired another player with major league experience, infielder Andrew Young, from the Arizona Diamondbacks in the minor league portion of the Rule 5 draft. The lockout was in effect for 99 days, delaying the start of spring training and forcing some games in the regular season to be rescheduled, before owners voted unanimously to lift it after a new collective bargaining agreement was agreed to March 10, 2022.

Following the lockout, the Nationals signed infielder Ehire Adrianza and right-handed reliever Steve Cishek to major league deals announced March 14, 2022. The Nationals also brought back reliever Sean Doolittle, who served as the team's closer for parts of the 2017, 2018, and 2019 seasons and departed as a free agent after the 2020 season, announcing a one-year major league pact with the left-hander on March 16. Nelson Cruz signed a one-year deal with the Nationals that was announced the following day, filling Washington's need at the new designated hitter lineup spot. With an open roster spot due to third baseman Carter Kieboom spraining his ulnar collateral ligament of the elbow and landing on the 60-day injured list, the Nationals claimed former first-round pick Hunter Harvey, a right-handed pitcher, off waivers from the San Francisco Giants on March 21.

Transactions 

October 5, 2021: The Nationals signed infielder Alcides Escobar to a one-year contract extension.
October 13, 2021: The Nationals outrighted left-handed pitchers Alberto Baldonado and Sean Nolin and right-handed pitcher Steven Fuentes to the Triple-A Rochester Red Wings; Nolin elected free agency.
October 18, 2021: The Nationals hired hitting coach Darnell Coles.
November 3, 2021: The Nationals hired first base coach Eric Young Jr., third base coach Gary DiSarcina, and bullpen coach Ricky Bones.
November 5, 2021: The Nationals claimed left-handed pitcher Francisco Pérez off waivers from the Cleveland Guardians and outrighted right-handed pitcher Kyle McGowin to the Triple-A Rochester Red Wings.
November 19, 2021: The Nationals selected the contracts of outfielder Donovan Casey and left-handed pitcher Evan Lee.
November 30, 2021: The Nationals signed infielder César Hernández to a one-year major league contract, claimed infielder Lucius Fox off waivers from the Baltimore Orioles, and declined to tender new contracts to right-handed pitchers Ryne Harper and Wander Suero and first baseman Mike Ford.
March 14, 2022: The Nationals signed infielder Ehire Adrianza and right-handed relief pitcher Steve Cishek to one-year major league contracts.
March 16, 2022: The Nationals signed left-handed relief pitcher Sean Doolittle to a one-year major league contract.
March 17, 2022: The Nationals signed designated hitter Nelson Cruz to a one-year major league contract and designated right-handed pitcher Jhon Romero for assignment; he was claimed off waivers by the Minnesota Twins.
March 21, 2022: The Nationals claimed right-handed pitcher Hunter Harvey off waivers from the San Francisco Giants.
April 2, 2022: The Nationals outrighted outfielder Andrew Stevenson to the Triple-A Rochester Red Wings.
April 5, 2022: The Nationals selected the contract of right-handed pitcher Aníbal Sánchez.
April 6, 2022: The Nationals designated right-handed pitcher Gabe Klobosits for assignment; he was claimed off waivers by the Oakland Athletics.
April 7, 2022: The Nationals selected the contracts of right-handed pitcher Víctor Arano and infielders Maikel Franco and Dee Strange-Gordon.

Spring training 

The Nationals held spring training at their facility at The Ballpark of the Palm Beaches in West Palm Beach, Florida, which they share with the Houston Astros in their sixth year at the facility.

Non-roster participants in major league spring training for the Nationals included right-handed pitchers Víctor Arano, Cade Cavalli, Carl Edwards Jr., Jace Fry, Reed Garrett, Erasmo Ramírez, Jefry Rodríguez, Jackson Rutledge, Aaron Sanchez, Aníbal Sánchez, and Jordan Weems; left-handed pitchers Luis Avilán, Alberto Baldonado, and Matt Cronin; catchers Taylor Gushue, Chris Herrmann, Drew Millas, and Israel Pineda; infielders Jackson Cluff, Maikel Franco, Jake Noll, Adrián Sánchez, Dee Strange-Gordon, Richard Ureña, and Andrew Young; and outfielder Gerardo Parra. Right-handed reliever Tyler Clippard, who pitched with the Nationals for seven years through the 2014 season, was a late addition to the list of non-roster invitees, signing a minor league deal with Washington announced March 26.

Several Nationals players dealt with injuries during spring training. Carter Kieboom, expected to contend for an everyday role again as Washington's third baseman, landed on the 60-day injured list after being diagnosed with a flexor mass strain and partially torn UCL in his right arm. Ehire Adrianza, signed in the offseason as a utilityman, injured his quadriceps while running the bases in an exhibition game and landed on the 10-day injured list. Reliever Will Harris, in the final year of an injury-plagued three-year contract with Washington, appeared in just one game before being sidelined with lingering issues from his 2021 thoracic outlet surgery. Harris left camp early and underwent another surgery on his arm to remove scar tissue that was impinging upon a nerve. He was placed on the 60-day injured list as well. Staff ace Stephen Strasburg and pitching prospect Seth Romero also went to the injured list to begin the season, with Strasburg on the 10-day IL for continuing rehab from thoracic outlet surgery and Romero on the 60-day IL with a left calf strain.

Andrew Stevenson, in contention for a bench spot as an outfielder, was cut from the team roster on April 2. The Nationals outrighted Stevenson, who was ineligible for optional assignment, to the Triple-A Rochester Red Wings. Stevenson's roster spot went to Aníbal Sánchez, who was initially a non-roster invitee in his return to the Nationals organization after previously pitching for Washington in the 2019 and 2020 seasons. The Nationals also gave Arano, Franco, and Strange-Gordon spots on the Opening Day roster, as well as promoting prospects Joan Adon and Lucius Fox after they impressed during spring training. Relief prospect Gabe Klobosits was designated for assignment in a corresponding move.

In Grapefruit League play against other teams with spring training complexes in South Florida, the Nationals went 4–11.

Regular season

Opening Day lineup

Season standings

National League East

National League Wild Card

Record vs. opponents

Notable transactions 
April 15, 2022: The Nationals claimed outfielder Josh Palacios off waivers from the Toronto Blue Jays.
April 21, 2022: The Nationals selected the contract of right-handed pitcher Erasmo Ramírez.
April 23, 2022: The Nationals selected the contract of right-handed pitcher Aaron Sanchez and designated right-handed pitcher Patrick Murphy for assignment; he was outrighted to the Triple-A Rochester Red Wings.
May 4, 2022: The Nationals claimed right-handed pitcher Cory Abbott off waivers from the San Francisco Giants.
May 28, 2022: The Nationals designated right-handed pitcher Aaron Sanchez for assignment; he elected free agency.
May 31, 2022: The Nationals selected the contract of right-handed pitcher Jordan Weems and designated right-handed pitcher Austin Voth for assignment; he was claimed off waivers by the Baltimore Orioles.
June 14, 2022: The Nationals selected the contracts of right-handed pitchers Reed Garrett and Jackson Tetreault and designated infielder/outfielder Dee Strange-Gordon for assignment; he elected free agency.
July 1, 2022: The Nationals designated left-handed pitcher Sam Clay for assignment; he was claimed off waivers by the Philadelphia Phillies.
July 13, 2022: The Nationals selected the contract of right-handed pitcher Tyler Clippard.
August 1, 2022: The Nationals acquired minor league outfielder Trey Harris from the Atlanta Braves for infielder/outfielder Ehire Adrianza and selected the contract of infielder Ildemaro Vargas.
August 2, 2022: The Nationals acquired shortstop CJ Abrams, left-handed pitcher MacKenzie Gore, first baseman Luke Voit, minor league outfielders Robert Hassell III and James Wood, and minor league pitcher Jarlin Susana from the San Diego Padres for first baseman Josh Bell and outfielder Juan Soto, selected the contract of first baseman Joey Meneses, and designated left-handed pitcher Josh Rogers for assignment; he elected free agency.
August 3, 2022: The Nationals released infielder Alcides Escobar.
August 7, 2022: The Nationals claimed outfielder Alex Call off waivers from the Cleveland Guardians.
August 9, 2022: The Nationals claimed left-handed pitcher Jake McGee off waivers from the Milwaukee Brewers and designated outfielder Donovan Casey for assignment; he was outrighted to the Triple-A Rochester Red Wings.
August 23, 2022: The Nationals designated right-handed pitcher Tyler Clippard for assignment; he elected free agency.
August 25, 2022: The Nationals claimed right-handed pitcher Tommy Romero off waivers from the Tampa Bay Rays.
August 26, 2022: The Nationals selected the contract of right-handed pitcher Cade Cavalli and released third baseman Maikel Franco.
September 9, 2022: The Nationals selected the contract of catcher Israel Pineda and designated left-handed pitcher Jake McGee for assignment.

Major league debuts 
April 10, 2022: Lucius Fox
June 1, 2022: Evan Lee
June 14, 2022: Jackson Tetreault
August 2, 2022: Joey Meneses
August 26, 2022: Cade Cavalli
September 11, 2022: Israel Pineda

Game Log 
Due to the 2021–22 Major League Baseball lockout, Opening Day was pushed back to April 7, and the first two series of the season were rescheduled.

|- style="background:#bbb;"
| - || March 31 || @ Mets || colspan=7|Postponed (lockout) Makeup on October 3

|- style="background:#bbb;"
| - || April 2 || @ Mets || colspan=7|Postponed (lockout) Makeup on October 4
|- style="background:#bbb;"
| - || April 3 || @ Mets || colspan=7|Postponed (lockout) Makeup on October 5
|- style="background:#bbb;"
| - || April 4 || Phillies || colspan=7|Postponed (lockout) Makeup on June 17
|- style="background:#bbb;"
| - || April 6 || Phillies || colspan=7|Postponed (lockout) Makeup on October 1
|- style="background:#fbb;"
| 1 || April 7 || Mets || 1–5 || Megill (1–0) || Corbin (0–1) || — || 35,052 || 0–1 || L1
|- style="background:#fbb;"
| 2 || April 8 || Mets || 3–7 || Scherzer (1–0) || Gray (0–1) || — || 25,677 || 0–2 || L2
|- style="background:#fbb;"
| 3 || April 9 || Mets || 0–5 || Bassitt (1–0) || Adon (0–1) || — || 21,369 || 0–3 || L3
|- style="background:#bfb;"
| 4 || April 10 || Mets || 4–2 || Finnegan (1–0) || Williams (0–1) || Rainey (1) || 23,158 || 1–3 || W1
|- style="background:#bfb;"
| 5 || April 11 || @ Braves || 11–2 || Rogers (1–0) || Ynoa (0–1) || — || 42,263 || 2–3 || W2
|- style="background:#fbb;"
| 6 || April 12 || @ Braves || 4–16 || Elder (1–0) || Corbin (0–2) || Stephens (1) || 31,462 || 2–4 || L1
|- style="background:#bfb;"
| 7 || April 13 || @ Braves || 3–1 || Gray (1–1) || Fried (0–2) || Rainey (2) || 31,959 || 3–4 || W1
|- style="background:#fbb;"
| 8 || April 14 || @ Pirates || 4–9 || Contreras (1–0) || Adon (0–2) || — || 9,266 || 3–5 || L1
|- style="background:#bfb;"
| 9 || April 15 || @ Pirates || 7–2 || Fedde (1–0) || Keller (0–2) || — || 13,076 || 4–5 || W1
|- style="background:#fbb;"
| 10 || April 16 || @ Pirates || 4–6 || Peters (2–0) || Rogers (1–1) || — || 8,676 || 4–6 || L1
|- style="background:#fbb;"
| 11 || April 17 || @ Pirates || 3–5 || Hembree (1–0) || Cishek (0–1) || Bednar (1) || 8,735 || 4–7 || L2
|- style="background:#bbb;"
| — || April 18 || Diamondbacks || colspan=7|Postponed (rain) Makeup on April 19
|- style="background:#bfb;"
| 12 || April 19  || Diamondbacks || 6–1 || Gray (2–1) || Bumgarner (0–1) || — || 9,261 || 5–7 || W1
|- style="background:#bfb;"
| 13 || April 19  || Diamondbacks || 1–0 || Adon (1–2) || Gilbert (0–1) || Rainey (3) || 11,720 || 6–7 || W2
|- style="background:#fbb;"
| 14 || April 20 || Diamondbacks || 2–11 || Kelly (1–0) || Fedde (1–1) || — || 15,774 || 6–8 || L1
|- style="background:#fbb;"
| 15 || April 21 || Diamondbacks || 3–4 || Davies (1–1) || Rogers (1–2) || Melancon (2) || 14,424 || 6–9 || L2
|- style="background:#fbb;"
| 16 || April 22 || Giants || 1–7 || Junis (1–0) || Corbin (0–3) || — || 23,751 || 6–10 || L3
|- style="background:#fbb;"
| 17 || April 23 || Giants || 2–5 || Wood (2–0) || Sanchez (0–1) || Doval (3) || 27,799 || 6–11 || L4
|- style="background:#fbb;"
| 18 || April 24 || Giants || 3–12 || Webb (2–1) || Adon (1–3) || — || 26,003 || 6–12 || L5
|- style="background:#fbb;"
| 19 || April 26 || Marlins || 2–5 || Alcántara (2–0) || Gray (2–2) || Bender (3) || 12,613 || 6–13 || L6
|- style="background:#fbb;"
| 20 || April 27 || Marlins || 1–2 || López (3–0) || Fedde (1–2) || Bender (4) || 13,356 || 6–14 || L7
|- style="background:#fbb;"
| 21 || April 28 || Marlins || 2–3 || Rogers (1–3) || Corbin (0–4) || Sulser (1) || 12,454 || 6–15 || L8
|- style="background:#bfb;"
| 22 || April 29 || @ Giants || 14–4 || Sanchez (1–1) || Wood (2–1) || — || 38,256 || 7–15 || W1
|- style="background:#fbb;"
| 23 || April 30 || @ Giants || 3–9 || Webb (3–1) || Adon (1–4) || — || 33,241 || 7–16 || L1
|-

|- style="background:#bfb;"
| 24 || May 1 || @ Giants || 11–5 || Gray (3–2) || Cobb (1–1) || — || 38,451 || 8–16 || W1
|- style="background:#bfb;"
| 25 || May 3 || @ Rockies || 10–2 || Fedde (2–2) || Márquez (0–2) || — || 20,758 || 9–16 || W2
|- style="background:#fbb;"
| 26 || May 4 || @ Rockies || 2–5 || Gomber (2–2) || Corbin (0–5) || Bard (7) || 19,387 || 9–17 || L1
|- style="background:#fbb;"
| 27 || May 5 || @ Rockies || 7–9 || Chacín (3–1) || Sanchez (1–2) || Bard (8) || 30,139 || 9–18 || L2
|- style="background:#fbb;"
| 28 || May 6 || @ Angels || 0–3 || Díaz (1–0) || Adon (1–5) || Iglesias (7) || 41,923 || 9–19 || L3
|- style="background:#bfb;"
| 29 || May 7 || @ Angels || 7–3 || Gray (4–2) || Lorenzen (3–2) || — || 30,666 || 10–19 || W1
|- style="background:#fbb;"
| 30 || May 8 || @ Angels || 4–5 || Barría (1–0) || Rainey (0–1) || — || 32,337 || 10–20 || L1
|- style="background:#fbb;"
| 31 || May 10 || Mets || 2–4 || Carrasco (3–1) || Edwards Jr. (0–1) || Díaz (7) || 21,955 || 10–21 || L2
|- style="background:#bfb;"
| 32 || May 11 || Mets || 8–3 || Sanchez (2–2) || Megill (4–2) || — || 19,715 || 11–21 || W1
|- style="background:#fbb;"
| 33 || May 12 || Mets || 1–4 || Walker (1–0) || Adon (1–6) || — || 21,213 || 11–22 || L1
|- style="background:#fbb;"
| 34 || May 13 || Astros || 1–6 || Valdez (2–2) || Gray (4–3) || — || 18,433 || 11–23 || L2
|- style="background:#bfb;"
| 35 || May 14 || Astros || 13–6 || Rogers (2–2) || Javier (2–1) || — || 22,949 || 12–23 || W1
|- style="background:#fbb;"
| 36 || May 15 || Astros || 0–8 || Verlander (5–1) || Corbin (0–6) || — || 25,915 || 12–24 || L1
|- style="background:#fbb;"
| 37 || May 16 || @ Marlins || 2–8 || Alcántara (3–2) || Sanchez (2–3) || — || 6,601 || 12–25 || L2
|- style="background:#fbb;"
| 38 || May 17 || @ Marlins || 1–5 || Bender (1–3) || Adon (1–7) || — || 8,097 || 12–26 || L3
|- style="background:#bfb;"
| 39 || May 18 || @ Marlins || 5–4  || Rainey (1–1) || Castano (0–1) || Arano (1) || 7,566 || 13–26 || W1
|- style="background:#fbb;"
| 40 || May 20 || @ Brewers || 0–7 || Lauer (4–1) || Fedde (2–3) || — || 29,609 || 13–27 || L1
|- style="background:#fbb;"
| 41 || May 21 || @ Brewers || 1–5 || Woodruff (5–2) || Corbin (0–7) || Hader (15) || 34,837 || 13–28 || L2
|- style="background:#bfb;"
| 42 || May 22 || @ Brewers || 8–2 || Sanchez (3–3) || Peralta (3–2) || — || 39,822 || 14–28 || W1
|- style="background:#fbb;"
| 43 || May 23 || Dodgers || 1–10 || Anderson (5–0) || Adon (1–8) || — || 22,423 || 14–29 || L1
|- style="background:#fbb;"
| 44 || May 24 || Dodgers || 4–9 || Buehler (6–1) || Gray (4–4) || — || 22,413 || 14–30 || L2
|- style="background:#bfb;"
| 45 || May 25 || Dodgers || 1–0 || Fedde (3–3) || Urías (3–4) || Rainey (4) || 23,341 || 15–30 || W1
|- style="background:#bfb;"
| 46 || May 26 || Rockies || 7–3 || Corbin (1–7) || Márquez (1–5) || — || 16,264 || 16–30 || W2
|- style="background:#bbb;"
| — || May 27 || Rockies || colspan=7|Postponed (rain) Makeup on May 28
|- style="background:#bfb;"
| 47 || May 28  || Rockies || 13–7 || Ramírez (1–0) || Gomber (2–5) || — || 20,294 || 17–30 || W3
|- style="background:#fbb;"
| 48 || May 28  || Rockies || 2–3 || Kuhl (4–2) || Finnegan (1–1) || Bard (11) || 26,535 || 17–31 || L1
|- style="background:#bfb;"
| 49 || May 29 || Rockies || 6–5 || Gray (5–4) || Freeland (1–5) || Rainey (5) || 25,225 || 18–31 || W1
|- style="background:#fbb;"
| 50 || May 30 || @ Mets || 5–13 || Holderman (2–0) || Fedde (3–4) || — || 22,007 || 18–32 || L1
|- style="background:#fbb;"
| 51 || May 31 || @ Mets || 0–10 || Williams (1–3) || Corbin (1–8) || — || 25,263 || 18–33 || L2
|-

|- style="background:#fbb;"
| 52 || June 1 || @ Mets || 0–5 || Carrasco (6–1) || Lee (0–1) || — || 25,417 || 18–34 || L3
|- style="background:#fbb;"
| 53 || June 2 || @ Reds || 1–8 || Ashcraft (2–0) || Adon (1–9) || — || 12,799 || 18–35 || L4
|- style="background:#bfb;"
| 54 || June 3 || @ Reds || 8–5 || Gray (6–4) || Minor (0–1) || Rainey (6) || 19,032 || 19–35 || W1
|- style="background:#bfb;"
| 55 || June 4 || @ Reds || 10–8 || Finnegan (2–1) || Strickland (0–2) || Rainey (7) || 23,128 || 20–35 || W2
|- style="background:#bfb;"
| 56 || June 5 || @ Reds || 5–4 || Corbin (2–8) || Castillo (2–3) || Cishek (1) || 16,380 || 21–35 || W3
|- style="background:#fbb;"
| 57 || June 7 || @ Marlins || 2–12 || Cabrera (2–0) || Adon (1–10) || — || 7,112 || 21–36 || L1
|- style="background:#fbb;"
| 58 || June 8 || @ Marlins || 1–2  || Scott (2–1) || Rainey (1–2) || — || 7,193 || 21–37 || L2
|- style="background:#fbb;"
| 59 || June 9 || @ Marlins || 4–7 || Rogers (3–5) || Strasburg (0–1) || Scott (3) || 9,108 || 21–38 || L3
|- style="background:#bfb;"
| 60 || June 10 || Brewers || 11–5 || Fedde (4–4) || Ashby (1–5) || — || 26,111 || 22–38 || W1
|- style="background:#bfb;"
| 61 || June 11 || Brewers || 8–6 || Corbin (3–8) || Lauer (5–2) || — || 25,265 || 23–38 || W2
|- style="background:#fbb;"
| 62 || June 12 || Brewers || 1–4 || Milner (3–1) || Espino (0–1) || Hader (19) || 22,549 || 23–39 || L1
|- style="background:#fbb;"
| 63 || June 13 || Braves || 5–9 || Lee (1–0) || Ramírez (1–1) || — || 20,571 || 23–40 || L2
|- style="background:#fbb;"
| 64 || June 14 || Braves || 4–10 || Fried (7–2) || Tetreault (0–1) || Stephens (2) || 24,490 || 23–41 || L3
|- style="background:#fbb;"
| 65 || June 15 || Braves || 2–8 || Strider (3–2) || Fedde (4–5) || — || 21,153 || 23–42 || L4
|- style="background:#fbb;"
| 66 || June 16 || Phillies || 1–10 || Wheeler (6–3) || Corbin (3–9) || — || 19,944 || 23–43 || L5
|- style="background:#fbb;"
| 67 || June 17  (1) || Phillies || 3–5 || Suárez (5–4) || Adon (1–11) || Hand (2) || 15,501 || 23–44 || L6
|- style="background:#fbb;"
| 68 || June 17  (2)  || Phillies || 7–8  || Alvarado (1–1) || Cishek (0–2) || — || 24,785 || 23–45 || L7
|- style="background:#fbb;"
| 69 || June 18 || Phillies || 1–2  || Hand (2–1) || Garrett (0–1) || Domínguez (1) || 42,730 || 23–46 || L8
|- style="background:#bfb;"
| 70 || June 19 || Phillies || 9–3 || Tetreault (1–1) || Eflin (2–5) || — || 32,261 || 24–46 || W1
|- style="background:#bfb;"
| 71 || June 21 || @ Orioles || 3–0 || Fedde (5–5) || Lyles (4–6) || Rainey (8) || 19,197 || 25–46 || W2
|- style="background:#fbb;"
| 72 || June 22 || @ Orioles || 0–7  || Wells (5–4) || Corbin (3–10) || Vespi (1) || 12,630 || 25–47 || L1
|- style="background:#bfb;"
| 73 || June 24 || @ Rangers || 2–1 || Edwards Jr. (1–1) || Santana (3–3) || Rainey (9) || 28,854 || 26–47 || W1
|- style="background:#fbb;"
| 74 || June 25 || @ Rangers || 2–3 || Barlow (3–1) || Finnegan (2–2) || — || 36,183 || 26–48 || L1
|- style="background:#bfb;"
| 75 || June 26 || @ Rangers || 6–4 || Tetreault (2–1) || Otto (4–3) || Rainey (10) || 34,220 || 27–48 || W1
|- style="background:#bfb;"
| 76 || June 27 || Pirates || 3–2 || Edwards Jr. (2–1) || Stratton (4–4) || Finnegan (1) || 18,213 || 28–48 || W2
|- style="background:#bfb;"
| 77 || June 28 || Pirates || 3–1 || Corbin (4–10) || Crowe (3–5) || Rainey (11) || 22,757 || 29–48 || W3
|- style="background:#fbb;"
| 78 || June 29 || Pirates || 7–8 || De Jong (3–0) || Edwards Jr. (2–2) || De Los Santos (1) || 19,870 || 29–49 || L1
|-

|- style="background:#fbb;"
| 79 || July 1 || Marlins || 3–6 || Rogers (4–6) || Gray (6–5) || Scott (8) || 23,794 || 29–50 || L2
|- style="background:#fbb;"
| 80 || July 2 || Marlins || 3–5 || Castano (1–1) || Tetreault (2–2) || Scott (9) || 19,674 || 29–51 || L3
|- style="background:#fbb;"
| 81 || July 3 || Marlins || 4–7  || Scott (4–2) || Edwards Jr. (2–3) || Floro (1) || 25,385 || 29–52 || L4
|- style="background:#fbb;"
| 82 || July 4 || Marlins || 2–3  || Yacabonis (1–1) || Rainey (1–3) || Floro (2) || 25,129 || 29–53 || L5
|- style="background:#fbb;"
| 83 || July 5 || @ Phillies || 0–11 || Sánchez (1–1) || Espino (0–2) || — || 20,217 || 29–54 || L6
|- style="background:#bfb;"
| 84 || July 6 || @ Phillies || 3–2 || Gray (7–5) || Nola (5–6) || Rainey (12) || 22,369 || 30–54 || W1
|- style="background:#fbb;"
| 85 || July 7 || @ Phillies || 3–5 || Nelson (3–1) || Adon (1–12) || Domínguez (3) || 22,104 || 30–55 || L1
|- style="background:#fbb;"
| 86 || July 8 || @ Braves || 2–12 || Morton (5–3) || Fedde (5–6) || — || 41,725 || 30–56 || L2
|- style="background:#fbb;"
| 87 || July 9 || @ Braves || 3–4 || Wright (10–4) || Corbin (4–11) || Minter (3) || 40,632 || 30–57 || L3
|- style="background:#fbb;"
| 88 || July 10 || @ Braves || 3–4  || McHugh (2–1) || Weems (0–1) || — || 32,053 || 30–58 || L4
|- style="background:#bbb;"
| — || July 12 || Mariners || colspan=7|Postponed (rain) Makeup on July 13
|- style="background:#fbb;"
| 89 || July 13  || Mariners || 4–6 || Flexen (6–8) || Gray (7–6) || Sewald (11) || 16,260 || 30–59 || L5
|- style="background:#fbb;"
| 90 || July 13  || Mariners || 1–2 || Milone (1–1) || Fedde (5–7) || Sewald (12) || 19,869 || 30–60 || L6
|- style="background:#fbb;"
| 91 || July 14 || Braves || 4–5 || Wright (11–4) || Sánchez (0–1) || Jansen (21) || 25,577 || 30–61 || L7
|- style="background:#fbb;"
| 92 || July 15 || Braves || 4–8 || Anderson (8–5) || Corbin (4–12) || Minter (5) || 30,409 || 30–62 || L8
|- style="background:#fbb;"
| 93 || July 16 || Braves || 3–6 || Fried (10–3) || Espino (0–3) || Jansen (22) || 37,880 || 30–63 || L9
|- style="background:#bfb;"
| 94 || July 17 || Braves || 7–3 || Cishek (1–2) || Strider (4–3) || — || 26,043 || 31–63 || W1
|- style="text-align:center; background:#bbb;"
|colspan=10| All–Star Break (July 18–21)
|- style="background:#fbb;"
| 95 || July 22 || @ Diamondbacks || 1–10 || Gallen (5–2) || Corbin (4–13) || — || 17,819 || 31–64 || L1
|- style="background:#fbb;"
| 96 || July 23 || @ Diamondbacks || 2–7 || Bumgarner (6–9) || Sánchez (0–2) || — || 37,802 || 31–65 || L2
|- style="background:#bfb;"
| 97 || July 24 || @ Diamondbacks || 4–3 || Edwards Jr. (3–3) || Mantiply (1–3) || Finnegan (2) || 20,278 || 32–65 || W1
|- style="background:#bfb;"
| 98 || July 25 || @ Dodgers || 4–1 || Machado (1–0) || Gonsolin (11–1) || Finnegan (3) || 48,647 || 33–65 || W2
|- style="background:#bfb;"
| 99 || July 26 || @ Dodgers || 8–3 || Ramírez (2–1) || Cleavinger (0–1) || — || 53,302 || 34–65 || W3
|- style="background:#fbb;"
| 100 || July 27 || @ Dodgers || 1–7 || Vesia (3–0) || Corbin (4–14) || — || 44,229 || 34–66 || L1
|- style="background:#fbb;"
| 101 || July 29 || Cardinals || 2–6 || Mikolas (8–8) || Sánchez (0–3) || — || 30,170 || 34–67 || L2
|- style="background:#bfb;"
| 102 || July 30 || Cardinals || 7–6 || Ramírez (3–1) || Cabrera (3–2) || Finnegan (4) || 34,440 || 35–67 || W1
|- style="background:#fbb;"
| 103 || July 31 || Cardinals || 0–5 || Pallante (4–4) || Gray (7–7) || — || 28,738 || 35–68 || L1
|-

|- style="background:#fbb;"
| 104 || August 1 || Mets || 3–7 || Scherzer (7–2) || Corbin (4–15) || — || 29,034 || 35–69 || L2
|- style="background:#bfb;"
| 105 || August 2 || Mets || 5–1 || Arano (1–0) || Nogosek (0–1) || — || 29,878 || 36–69 || W1
|- style="background:#fbb;"
| 106 || August 3 || Mets || 5–9 || Bassitt (8–7) || Sánchez (0–4) || — || 27,851 || 36–70 || L1
|- style="background:#fbb;"
| 107 || August 4 || @ Phillies || 4–5  || Syndergaard (6–8) || Espino (0–4) || — || 35,393 || 36–71 || L2
|- style="background:#fbb;"
| 108 || August 5 || @ Phillies || 2–7 || Gibson (7–4) || Gray (7–8) || — || 22,024 || 36–72 || L3
|- style="background:#fbb;"
| 109 || August 6 || @ Phillies || 5–11 || Suárez (8–5) || Corbin (4–16) || — || 27,078 || 36–73 || L4
|- style="background:#fbb;"
| 110 || August 7 || @ Phillies || 1–13 || Nola (8–8) || Abbott (0–1) || — || 28,672 || 36–74 || L5
|- style="background:#fbb;"
| 111 || August 8 || @ Cubs || 3–6 || Thompson (9–5) || Sánchez (0–5) || Wick (5) || 30,904 || 36–75 || L6
|- style="background:#bfb;"
| 112 || August 9 || @ Cubs || 6–5 || Finnegan (3–2) || Leiter Jr. (2–5) || Edwards Jr. (1) || 37,193 || 37–75 || W1
|- style="background:#fbb;"
| 113 || August 10 || @ Cubs || 2–4 || Rucker (1–1) || Cishek (1–3) || Wick (6) || 29,019 || 37–76 || L1
|- style="background:#fbb;"
| 114 || August 12 || Padres || 5–10 || Clevinger (4–4) || Abbott (0–2) || — || 35,390 || 37–77 || L2
|- style="background:#bfb;"
| 115 || August 13 || Padres || 4–3 || Finnegan (4–2) || Darvish (10–6) || Edwards Jr. (2) || 33,661 || 38–77 || W1
|- style="background:#fbb;"
| 116 || August 14 || Padres || 0–6 || Snell (5–6) || Espino (0–5) || — || 27,498 || 38–78 || L1
|- style="background:#bfb;"
| 117 || August 15 || Cubs || 5–4 || Edwards Jr. (4–3) || Hughes (1–1) || Finnegan (5) || 25,467 || 39–78 || W1
|- style="background:#fbb;"
| 118 || August 16 || Cubs || 5–7  || Hughes (2–1) || Arano (1–1) || Leiter Jr. (1) || 26,362 || 39–79 || L1
|- style="background:#fbb;"
| 119 || August 17 || Cubs || 2–3 || Uelmen (1–1) || McGee (1–3) || Wick (8) || 28,302 || 39–80 || L2
|- style="background:#bfb;"
| 120 || August 18 || @ Padres || 3–1 || Edwards Jr. (5–3) || Darvish (10–7) || Finnegan (6) || 41,820 || 40–80 || W1
|- style="background:#bfb;"
| 121 || August 19 || @ Padres || 6–3 || Ramírez (4–1) || Hader (2–5) || Finnegan (7) || 39,474 || 41–80 || W2
|- style="background:#fbb;"
| 122 || August 20 || @ Padres || 1–2 || Morejón (3–0) || Cishek (1–4) || García (3) || 42,529 || 41–81 || L1
|- style="background:#fbb;"
| 123 || August 21 || @ Padres || 1–2 || Manaea (7–6) || Corbin (4–17) || Martinez (5) || 38,253 || 41–82 || L2
|- style="background:#fbb;"
| 124 || August 23 || @ Mariners || 2–4 || Ray (10–8) || Fedde (5–8) || Sewald (16) || 38,254 || 41–83 || L3
|- style="background:#bfb;"
| 125 || August 24 || @ Mariners || 3–1 || Finnegan (5–2) || Sewald (3–4) || — || 21,035 || 42–83 || W1
|- style="background:#fbb;"
| 126 || August 26 || Reds || 3–7 || Minor (3–10) || Cavalli (0–1) || — || 31,526 || 42–84 || L1
|- style="background:#fbb;"
| 127 || August 27 || Reds || 2–6 || Gibaut (1–0) || Espino (0–6) || Díaz (6) || 30,325 || 42–85 || L2
|- style="background:#bfb;"
| 128 || August 28 || Reds || 3–2 || Corbin (5–17) || Lodolo (3–5) || Finnegan (8) || 31,411 || 43–85 || W1
|- style="background:#fbb;"
+++| 129 || August 30 || Athletics || 6–10 || Irvin (7–11) || Fedde (5–9) || — || 26,321 || 43–86 || L1
|- style="background:#bfb;"
| 130 || August 31 || Athletics || 5–1 || Sánchez (1–5) || Kaprielian (3–9) || — || 26,416 || 44–86 || W1
|-

|- style="background:#bfb;"
| 131 || September 1 || Athletics || 7–5  || Harvey (1–0) || Ruiz (0–1) || — || 26,877 || 45–86 || W2
|- style="background:#fbb;"
| 132 || September 2 || @ Mets || 3–7 || Givens (7–3) || Gray (7–9) || — || 33,630 || 45–87 || L1
|- style="background:#bfb;"
| 133 || September 3 || @ Mets || 7–1 || Corbin (6–17) || Ottavino (5–3) || — || 33,509 || 46–87 || W1
|- style="background:#bfb;"
| 134 || September 4 || @ Mets || 7–1 || Fedde (6–9) || Carrasco (13–6) || — || 31,711 || 47–87 || W2
|- style="background:#bfb;"
| 135 || September 5 || @ Cardinals || 6–0 || Sánchez (2–5) || Flaherty (0–1) || Thompson (1) || 45,779 || 48–87 || W3
|- style="background:#fbb;"
| 136 || September 6 || @ Cardinals || 1–4 || Quintana (5–6) || Espino (0–7) || Helsley (14) || 37,629 || 48–88 || L1
|- style="background:#fbb;"
| 137 || September 7 || @ Cardinals || 5–6 || Woodford (4–0) || Finnegan (5–3) || — || 34,715 || 48–89 || L2
|- style="background:#bfb;"
| 138 || September 8 || @ Cardinals || 11–6 || Thompson (1–0) || Pallante (6–5) || — || 40,437 || 49–89 || W1
|- style="background:#fbb;"
| 139 || September 9 || @ Phillies || 3–5 || Syndergaard (9–9) || Corbin (6–18) || Nelson (1) || 22,304 || 49–90 || L1
|- style="background:#fbb;"
| 140 || September 10 || @ Phillies || 5–8 || Suárez (9–5) || Fedde (6–10) || — || 37,185 || 49–91 || L2
|- style="background:#fbb;"
| 141 || September 11 || @ Phillies || 5–7 || Alvarado (4–2) || Finnegan (5–4) || Robertson (19) || 23,802 || 49–92 || L3
|- style="background:#fbb;"
| 142 || September 13 || Orioles || 3–4 || Kremer (7–5) || Harvey (1–1) || Bautista (13) || 31,679 || 49–93 || L4
|- style="background:#fbb;"
| 143 || September 14 || Orioles || 2–6 || Voth (5–2) || Thompson (1–1) || — || 32,497 || 49–94 || L5
|- style="background:#bfb;"
| 144 || September 16 || Marlins || 5–4 || Edwards Jr. (6–3) || Sulser (1–4) || Finnegan (9) || 24,931 || 50–94 || W1
|- style="background:#bfb;"
| 145 || September 17 || Marlins || 5–3 || Harvey (2–1) || Brigham (0–1) || Finnegan (10) || 34,179 || 51–94 || W2
|- style="background:#fbb;"
| 146 || September 18 || Marlins || 1–3 || Alcántara (13–8) || Sánchez (2–6) || — || 31,638 || 51–95 || L1
|- style="background:#fbb;"
| 147 || September 19 || @ Braves || 2–5 || Wright (19–5) || Abbott (0–3) || Jansen (35) || 33,443 || 51–96 || L2
|- style="background:#fbb;"
| 148 || September 20 || @ Braves || 2–3 || Morton (9–6) || Ramírez (4–2) || Jansen (36) || 40,224 || 51–97 || L3
|- style="background:#bfb;"
| 149 || September 21 || @ Braves || 3–2 || Machado (2–0) || Chavez (4–2) || Finnegan (11) || 37,240 || 52–97 || W1
|- style="background:#fbb;"
| 150 || September 23 || @ Marlins || 2–5 || Garrett (3–6) || Gray (7–10) || Floro (6) || 12,240 || 52–98 || L1
|- style="background:#fbb;"
| 151 || September 24 || @ Marlins || 1–4 || Alcántara (14–8) || Fedde (6–11) || Floro (7) || 16,099 || 52–99 || L2
|- style="background:#bfb;"
| 152 || September 25 || @ Marlins || 6–1 || Sánchez (3–6) || Cabrera (6–4) || — || 13,042 || 53–99 || W1
|- style="background:#fbb;"
| 153 || September 26 || Braves || 0–8 || Elder (2–3) || Abbott (0–4) || — || 24,684 || 53–100 || L1
|- style="background:#fbb;"
| 154 || September 27 || Braves || 2–8 || McHugh (3–2) || Espino (0–8) || — || 23,281 || 53–101 || L2
|- style="background:#bfb;"
| 155 || September 28 || Braves || 3–2  || Finnegan (6–4) || Stephens (3–3) || — || 24,876 || 54–101 || W1
|- style="background:#fbb;"
| 156 || September 30 || Phillies || 1–5 || Falter (6–4) || Fedde (6–12) || — || 24,682 || 54–102 || L1
|- style="background:#bbb"
| – || September 30 || Phillies || colspan=7|Postponed (rain) Makeup on October 1
|-

|- style="background:#bfb;"
| 157 || October 1  (1)  || Phillies || 13–4 || Sánchez (4–6) || Gibson (10–8) || — || 29,808 || 55–102 || W1
|- style="background:#fbb;"
| 158 || October 1  (2)  || Phillies || 2–8 || Syndergaard (10–10) || Romero (1–1) || Sánchez (1) || 36,841 || 55–103 || L1
|- style="background:#bbb"
| – || October 1 || Phillies || colspan=7|Rescheduled (Hurricane Ian forecast) Moved to September 30
|-
|- style="background:#fbb;"
| 159 || October 2 || Phillies || 1–8  || Wheeler (12–7) || Corbin (6–19) || — || 32,779 || 55–104 || L2
|- style="background:#bbb;"
| — || October 3 || @ Mets || colspan=7|Postponed (rain) Makeup on October 4
|- style="background:#fbb;"
| 160 || October 4  || @ Mets || 2–4 || Ottavino (6–3) || Abbott (0–5) || Díaz (32) ||  || 55–105 || L3
|- style="background:#fbb;"
| 161 || October 4  || @ Mets || 0–8 || Nogosek (1–1) || Espino (0–9) || — || 23,649 || 55–106 || L4
|- style="background:#fbb;"
| 162 || October 5 || @ Mets || 2–9 || Williams (3–5) || Fedde (6–13) || — || 27,298 || 55–107 || L5
|-

|- style="text-align:center;"
| Legend:       = Win       = Loss       = PostponementBold = Nationals team member

Roster

Statistics

Batting 
(Final Stats)
Players in bold are on the active roster.
Note: G = Games played; AB = At bats; R = Runs; H = Hits; 2B = Doubles; 3B = Triples; HR = Home runs; RBI = Runs batted in; SB = Stolen bases; BB = Walks; K = Strikeouts; AVG = Batting average; OBP = On Base Percentage; SLG = Slugging Percentage; TB = Total Bases

Source

Pitching 
(Final Stats)
Players in bold are on the active roster.
Note: W = Wins; L = Losses; ERA = Earned run average; WHIP = Walks plus hits per inning pitched; G = Games pitched; GS = Games started; SV = Saves; IP = Innings pitched; H = Hits allowed; R = Runs allowed; ER = Earned runs allowed; BB = Walks allowed; K = Strikeouts

Source

Awards and honors

All-Stars

Farm system

Broadcasting 
The Nationals are minority owners of the Mid-Atlantic Sports Network, which they share with the Baltimore Orioles under an agreement brokered by Major League Baseball.

The Nationals brought back veteran play-by-play television commentator Bob Carpenter for the 2022 season as well as the 2023 season. Carpenter was paired with new color commentator Kevin Frandsen, who played for the Nationals during the 2014 season. Color analyst F. P. Santangelo, originally hired ahead of the 2011 season, parted ways with MASN and the Nationals following the 2021 season.

Dave Jageler and Charlie Slowes are calling their 17th consecutive season together as the Nationals' play-by-play radio commentators.

References

External links 
2022 Washington Nationals season at Baseball Reference

Washington Nationals seasons
Washington Nationals
Washington Nationals